The Triumph Street Triple is a naked or streetfighter motorcycle made by Triumph Motorcycles, first released towards the end of 2007.
The bike is closely modelled on the Speed Triple 1050 but uses a re-tuned inline three cylinder 675 cc engine from the Daytona 675 sport bike, which was released in 2006.

Background
In 2007, a number of spy photos and speculative design drawings were reported in the motorcycle press, 
with one magazine capturing a road test of the completed Street Triple. 
Later articles reported on leaked design shots of the new bike. 
A report on the showcasing of the finished bike to dealers was published on 6 March 2007, along with a spy video of a test ride.

First generation (2007 - 2011)

The Triumph Street Triple was launched in 2007, to replace the 600 Speed Four. It shared the design of the modern Triumph naked models, introduced on the Speed Triple in 2005, with high-level double-barrel silencers, dual circular headlights with a dashboard unit mounted on the top. The biggest difference with the Speed Triple is the conventional swingarm, instead of the single-sided unit. 
The cycle parts are shared with the Triumph Daytona 675, mainly visible on the frame and swingarm. The 675cc triple cylinders engine, borrowed to the Daytona 675, is de-tuned to make it more street friendly and usable as a daily rider naked, but still powerful in the category with 79 kW (106 bhp) @ 11,750 rpm.
Since the Daytona 675 engine is a triple cylinders, Triumph introduced a new naming instead of adding the displacement to the Speed Triple name, making it a brand new model in Triumph history.

Launched in 2008, the Street Triple R shares the same engine and chassis as the standard model but has fully adjustable suspension both front and rear which is shared with the Daytona. The revised rear suspension results in a slightly higher seat height over the standard model and sharper rake. The front brakes are also shared with the Triumph 675 Daytona, with a fully radial Nissin setup, master cylinder and calipers. It has other minor equipment differences over the standard bike in the way of handlebars, seat, and different colour schemes which were matte orange and matte grey.

Second generation (2011 - 2012)
The Street Triple's circular headlights were changed to an angular shape for the 2012 model year, in line with the new identity of modern naked models, changed for the 2011 Speed Triple 1050 model. It was controversial at the time, because the circular headlights has been the identity of the modern naked models since 1997 and was quickly nicknamed the bugeye model from the bug like appearance the lights give the bike. The other changes includes redesigned side casings, brushed aluminum finish around the exhausts, black finish rear sets and revised stickers. The modifications were only cosmetics on both Street Triple and Street Triple R models, no changes were made on the engine, nor on the cycle parts.

Third generation (2013 - 2017)

In 2013, Triumph remodeled the chassis of the Street Triple. It includes a new frame unit, which is still in aluminum, but with less parts and welds. The caster angle is narrower, from 24,3° (on the previous model) to 24,1°. The old tubular sub-frame is changed for a new aluminum cast sub-frame unit. The most distinctive modification is a new exhaust mounted underneath the engine, replacing the underseat exhaust from the previous version, moving the centre of mass forwards and down. Lighter rims are also mounted on the bike. All these modifications make the bike both lighter and more agile; total mass was reduced by 6 kg, which is the lightest generation of Street Triples. The engine remained unchanged while the 1st gear was made considerably taller by taking the gear ratios from the Daytona 675. The 675 Street Triple gains also new suspensions, new brake discs that can be assisted by a multi-mode disengageable ABS, a coded key, more space under the saddle, a dashboard enriched with a fuel gauge, an improved finish, new mirrors and a discreet modification at the base of the tank. 

The Street Triple R gains a red sub-frame and the caster angle is narrower from 23,9° (on the previous model) to 23,4°. The R model remains distinctive with 19mm radial master cylinder and radial 4 pistons brake calipers around 310mm discs. The suspensions with a 41mm inverted fork and separate reservoir shock are adjustable for rebound, compression and preload. A disconnectable and configurable is available as an option.
. 

In February 2015 Triumph released the Street Triple Rx, based on the R model, with the angular seat unit from the Daytona 675, a quick-shifter and different colors (where the rims are red in any color scheme).

Fourth generation (2018 -)
In January 2017, Triumph announced they would replace the 675 cc Street Triple with a new range of  Street Triples. The model was released as a 2018 model. This generation comes with four models in the range, the base model S, intermediate R, and the new highest specification named RS. Like previous models, the headlights styling is shared with the 2016 Speed Triple. The fourth model is for the UK's A2 license, a  version of the S will also be sold.

Mid cycle update (2020)
For 2020, the Street Triple was given a mid cycle update. The more track-oriented RS version was given minor changes to the intake and exhaust with no change in power output, and cosmetic changes to the mirrors and headlight. A  lower seat height version, with a different seat and modified suspension, was added. The 2020 model was homologated by the FIM for racing in the World Supersport Next Generation class in 2022

2023 update
In 2023, the R and RS versions got an updated more powerful engine, shorter gearing, higher-spec Brembo Stylema brakes (for the RS) and revised chassis geometry (raising the back reduced the wheelbase, rake and trail, leading to sharper steering). For the first time, IMU-based cornering ABS and traction control were added. The R now comes with a full-TFT instrument cluster (although smaller than the 5-inch version on the RS). Fuel tank capacity was reduced by 2.4 liters to 15 liters. A new limited edition Moto2 version was introduced, with clip-ons instead of handlebars and further track-oriented improvements.

Special models
2011 - Street Triple Ace 675 CR

2014 - Street Triple R Team Empire Special Edition

2016 - Street Triple R 10th anniversary

2020 - Street Triple 765 RS Harley Quinn

2023 - Street Triple 765 Moto2

Miscellaneous
In 2010, Triumph launched the Tiger 800 and Tiger 800 XC, which use a longer stroke version of the Street Triple engine.

Use in racing

Starting from 2019, the Moto2 class of World Championship racing has been powered by specially tuned Triumph-supplied 765 cc engines based on the Street Triple, replacing the engines that were previously based on the Honda CBR600RR from 2010 to 2018. A three-year contract extension to provide engines for seasons 2022–2024 was obtained in 2021.

During 2021, the 765 engine was trialled in the British Supersport Championship which normally has a 675 capacity limit for three-cylinder engines. Together with models from Ducati and MV, engines with a larger capacity than previously are to be allowed into Supersport World Championship racing from 2022.

Specification

References

External links

Street Triple 675
Standard motorcycles
Motorcycles introduced in 2007